Tamaqua is a disused railway station located in Tamaqua, Pennsylvania. It is part of the Tamaqua Historic District. 

The station was originally constructed by the Philadelphia and Reading Railroad in 1874, which had earlier acquired the Little Schuylkill Navigation Railroad and Coal Company. It is a one-story brick building in the Italianate style. An addition was made to the original 1874 building in 1880, giving it a "T-plan." In 1885, a freight house was added.

The station ceased train operations in 1961 and was formally abandoned in 1981.

In 1984, a local family offered to purchase the railroad station and proposed that the building would be turned into a museum, similar to Steamtown, U.S.A. in Scranton, Pennsylvania.

It was listed on the National Register of Historic Places on December 26, 1985, as the Reading Railroad Passenger Station--Tamaqua.  

Following a $1.5 million restoration, the building was reopened in 2004 as a heritage center.

In 2023, the station is featured on a USPS Forever stamp in a 5-stamp "Railroad Stations" series. The stamp illustrations were made by Down the Street Designs, and Derry Noyes served as the art director.

References

External links
 Tamaqua Railroad Station
Visit Pennsylvania – Tamaqua Railroad Station

Italianate architecture in Pennsylvania
Railway stations on the National Register of Historic Places in Pennsylvania
Railway stations in the United States opened in 1874
Former Reading Company stations
Transportation buildings and structures in Schuylkill County, Pennsylvania
National Register of Historic Places in Schuylkill County, Pennsylvania
Former railway stations in Pennsylvania